The Ugly American is a 1963 American adventure film directed by George Englund, written by Stewart Stern, and starring Marlon Brando, Sandra Church, Eiji Okada, Pat Hingle, Judson Pratt, Reiko Sato, and Arthur Hill. It is based on the 1958 novel The Ugly American by Eugene Burdick and William Lederer. The film was released on April 2, 1963, by Universal Pictures.

Premise
American ambassador Harrison MacWhite (Marlon Brando) travels to a Southeast Asian country beleaguered by rival factions, but MacWhite views the political situation only in the simplest terms: as a struggle between communism and democracy. By the time that the ambassador finally sees the resultant political upheaval as something far more complicated, it may be too late.

Cast
 Marlon Brando as Ambassador Harrison Carter MacWhite
 Eiji Okada as Deong
 Sandra Church as Marion MacWhite
 Pat Hingle as Homer Atkins
 Arthur Hill as Grainger
 Jocelyn Brando as Emma Atkins
 Kukrit Pramoj as Prime Minister of Sarkhan
 Judson Pratt as Joe Bing
 Reiko Sato as Rachani, Deong's Wife
 George Shibata as Munsang
 Judson Laire as Senator Brenner
 Philip Ober as Ambassador Sears
 Yee Tak Yip as Sawad, Deong's Assistant
 Carl Benton Reid as Senator at Confirmation Hearing
 Simon Scott as Johnson
 Frances Helm as TadRed
 James Yegi as Berg 
 John Daheim as Her (as John Day)
 Leon Lontoc as Lee Pang
 Bill Stout as Tyler, NBC Reporter
 Stefan Schnabel as Andrei Krupitzyn

Production and screenplay 

The film version of the novel was made in 1963 and starred Marlon Brando as Ambassador Harrison Carter MacWhite. Reiko Sato was cast as Rachani at the urging of Brando, who had dated her years prior.

The screenplay was written by Stewart Stern, and the film was produced and directed by George Englund. The film was shot mainly in Hollywood, with Thailand serving as the inspiration for the background sceneries. Parts of the film were also shot on locations in Bangkok, Thailand, including at Chulalongkorn University, one of the leading institutes of higher learning of the country.

Critical reaction

The Ugly American received mixed reviews and was completely overwhelmed by a number of more popular films that year. The film won no Golden Globes and was not nominated for an Oscar. It did poorly at the box office and was not among the year's top 25 grossing films of 1963.

The New York Times reported that Brando “moves through the whole picture with authority and intelligence,” and the New York Daily News said it was “one of Brando’s best performances.” But the negative view was reflected by the critic in Time who wrote that Brando “attempts an important voice but most of the time he sounds like a small boy in a bathtub imitating Winston Churchill” and called it a “lousy picture.”

Review aggregator Rotten Tomatoes reports that 80% of critics have given the film a positive review, with a rating average of 6.1/10.

Of twenty-three reviews examined by historian Jon Cowans, fourteen were positive, five negative, and four neutral or mixed. Brando had given interviews where he questioned American Cold War politics, and some reviewers agreed, but few of these reviews mentioned that the film was set in a country very much like Vietnam. Only a few mentioned the point that, as The Dallas Morning News put it, one should “not assume that nationalism is inevitably anti-American,” and The New Republic was unusual in adding that “American blindness ... has driven many people particularly Asians, towards communism.” Some called Senator Brenner the real “ugly American” and objected to his McCarthyite tactics. The New York Post wrote that the film presented the dilemma that when Americans supported dictators, the Communists “make common revolutionary cause with the downtrodden.” Many East Coast reviews, however, objected to the film’s “oversimplification” of the issues. The Washington Post wrote it was “nothing more than a western about the bad guys and the good guys.” TV Guide in a review says 'Although well-intentioned, THE UGLY AMERICAN simply isn't a very good film. Part of the problem is that producer-director George Englund, a friend of star Brando, isn't much of a director, and as a result the film is static and ponderous. Brando once again turns in an interesting performance, but as demonstrated in many of his films of this period, one good performance does not a good film make'.

Political impact

Kukrit Pramoj, a Thai politician and scholar, was hired as a cultural expert/advisor to the film and later played the role of Sarkhan's Prime Minister "Kwen Sai". Later on, in 1975, he, in fact, became the 13th Prime Minister of Thailand. Probably because of this, the word "Sarkhan" entered the Thai language as a nickname of Thailand itself, often with a slight self-deprecating or mocking tone. Much of the 'Sarkhanese' spoken in the film is actually Thai.

References

External links

1963 films
1963 adventure films
American adventure films
American political films
Diplomats
Films about revolutions
Films based on American novels
Films directed by George Englund
Films scored by Frank Skinner
Films with screenplays by Stewart Stern
Films shot in Thailand
Universal Pictures films
1963 directorial debut films
Films about coups d'état
1960s English-language films
1960s American films